The Assistant Secretary of State for East Asian and Pacific Affairs is the head of the Bureau of East Asian and Pacific Affairs within the United States Department of State. The assistant secretary guides operation of the U.S. diplomatic establishment in the countries of the Asia-Pacific region and advises the secretary of state and the Under Secretary for Political Affairs on matters relating to the area.

The Department of State established the position of Assistant Secretary of State for Far Eastern Affairs in 1949, after the Commission on Organization of the Executive Branch of Government recommended that certain offices be upgraded to bureau level and after Congress increased the number of Assistant Secretaries of State from six to ten. On November 1, 1966, the department by administrative action changed the incumbent's designation to Assistant Secretary for East Asian and Pacific Affairs. The Division of Far Eastern Affairs, established in 1908, was the first geographical division to be established in the Department of State.

List of Assistant Secretaries of State for Far Eastern Affairs, 1949–1966

List of Assistant Secretaries of State for East Asian and Pacific Affairs, 1966–present

References

 
 
United States–Asian relations
United States–Oceanian relations
United States diplomacy